EIPR may refer to: 

 Egyptian Initiative for Personal Rights, an independent Egyptian human rights organization
 European Intellectual Property Review, a monthly law review